3i Infrastructure plc is an investment trust headquartered in Jersey. It is listed on the London Stock Exchange and is a constituent of the FTSE 250 Index.

History
The company was launched by way of an initial public offering in 2007. Its early investments included Anglian Water Group and Oiltanking GmbH's terminal facilities in the Netherlands, Malta, and Singapore. Between 2010 and 2020, 3i Infrastructure invested in businesses such as Esvagt, Infinis and Wireless Infrastructure Group, a UK mobile infrastructure provider. Since 2021, the company’s new investments have included SRL Traffic Systems, a UK manufacturer and supplier of temporary traffic equipment, and Global Cloud Xchange.

Major shareholder
About 30.2% of the company is owned by 3i Group plc.

References

External links
 Official site

3i Group companies
Financial services companies of the United Kingdom
Financial services companies established in 2007
2007 establishments in Jersey
Companies listed on the London Stock Exchange